Nancy Jane Kulp (August 28, 1921 – February 3, 1991) was an American character actress and comedienne best known as Miss Jane Hathaway on the CBS television series The Beverly Hillbillies.

Early life
Kulp was born to Robert Tilden and Marjorie C. (née Snyder) Kulp in Harrisburg, Pennsylvania. She was their only child. Kulp's father was a traveling salesman, and her mother was a schoolteacher and later a principal. The family moved from Mifflintown, Pennsylvania, to Miami-Dade County, Florida, sometime before 1935.

In 1943, Kulp graduated with a bachelor's degree in journalism from Florida State College for Women. She continued her studies for a master's degree in English and French at the University of Miami, where she was a member of the sorority Pi Beta Phi. Early in the 1940s, she also worked as a feature writer for the Miami Beach Tropics newspaper, writing profiles of celebrities such as Clark Gable and the Duke and Duchess of Windsor.

Military service
During World War II, Kulp left the University of Miami in 1944 to join the United States Naval Reserve. She attained the rank of lieutenant, junior grade, and received several decorations while in the service, including the American Campaign Medal. She was honorably discharged in 1946.

Career

Film
In 1951, not long after marrying Charles Malcolm Dacus, Kulp moved to Hollywood, California, to work in MGM's publicity department.  Director George Cukor at the studio soon convinced her that she should be an actress, so the same year she began her publicity job at MGM, she also made her film debut as a character actress in The Model and the Marriage Broker. She then appeared in other films, including Shane, Sabrina, and A Star is Born.  After working in television on The Bob Cummings Show and on Perry Mason in "The Case of the Deadly Toy" in 1959, Kulp returned to movies in Forever, Darling, The Three Faces of Eve, The Parent Trap, Who's Minding the Store?, and The Aristocats. In 1966, she appeared as Wilhelmina Peterson in the film The Night of the Grizzly, starring Clint Walker and Martha Hyer.

Television

In 1955 Kulp joined the cast of The Bob Cummings Show (Love That Bob) with Bob Cummings, portraying pith-helmeted neighborhood bird watcher Pamela Livingstone. In 1956, she appeared as a waitress in the episode "Johnny Bravo" of the ABC/Warner Brothers series Cheyenne, with Clint Walker. Kulp played the role of Anastasia in three episodes of the NBC sitcom It's a Great Life in 1955 and 1956. In 1958, she appeared in Orson Welles' little-known  pilot episode "The Fountain of Youth" in the television series Colgate Theatre.  In 1960, she appeared as Emma St. John in the episode "Kill with Kindness" of the ABC/WB detective series Bourbon Street Beat, starring Andrew Duggan.

Kulp appeared on I Love Lucy in the 1956 episode "Lucy Meets the Queen", performing as an English maid, who shows Lucy and Ethel how to curtsy properly before Queen Elizabeth. Kulp also appeared in episodes of The Real McCoys, Perry Mason ("The Case of the Prodigal Parent", 1958, and "The Case of the Deadly Toy", 1959), The Jack Benny Program ("Don's 27th Anniversary with Jack"), 87th Precinct ("Killer's Choice"), Pete and Gladys, The Twilight Zone (as Mrs. Gann in "The Fugitive"), and Outlaws ("The Dark Sunrise of Griff Kincaid, Esquire"). Kulp portrayed a slurring-drunk waitress in a scene with James Garner and Jean Willes in the 1959 Maverick episode "Full House".  She played a housekeeper in a pilot for The William Bendix Show, which aired as the 1960–1961 season finale of CBS's Mister Ed under the title "Pine Lake Lodge".  On the series My Three Sons in 1962, she portrayed a high school math and science teacher in two episodes under different character names, Miss Harris and Miss Fisher.

Shortly after her performances on My Three Sons in 1962, Kulp landed her breakout role as Jane Hathaway, the love-starved, bird-watching, perennial spinster, on the CBS television series The Beverly Hillbillies.  In 1967, she received an Emmy Award nomination for her role, and she remained with the show until its cancellation in 1971. In 1978, she appeared on The Love Boat in the episode "Mike and Ike / The Witness / The Kissing Bandit" and she played Aunt Gertrude in the episode "Tony and Julie / Separate Beds / America's Sweetheart".  On April 7, 1989, she played a nun in the Quantum Leap season 1 episode "The Right Hand of God". Kulp also appeared on The Brian Keith Show and Sanford and Son.

Theatre
Kulp also performed in the Broadway production of Morning's at Seven in 1980 to 1981 as Aaronetta Gibbs as a replacement for Elizabeth Wilson in the Lyceum Theatre.

Politics, academia and retirement
In 1984, after working with the Democratic state committee in her home state of Pennsylvania "on a variety of projects" over a period of years, Kulp ran unopposed as the Democratic nominee for the United States House of Representatives from Pennsylvania's 9th congressional district. As an opponent of the Republican incumbent Bud Shuster in a Republican-dominated district, Kulp was the decided underdog. Sixty-two years old at the time, Kulp said some voters might feel her background as an actress was "frivolous"; but she noted that Ronald Reagan had taken the route from screen to politics, and she said anyone who "listens and cares" can do well.

To her dismay, her Hillbillies co-star Buddy Ebsen contacted the Shuster campaign and volunteered to make a radio campaign ad in which he called Kulp "too liberal". Kulp said of Ebsen, "He's not the kindly old Jed Clampett that you saw on the show ... It's none of his business and he should have stayed out of it." She said Ebsen and she "didn't get along because I found him difficult to work with. But I never would have done something like this to him." Garnering 59,449 votes—just 33.6% of the ballots cast in the election—to Shuster's 117,203 votes and 66.4%, she lost. After this, according to her close friends and family, Ebsen was regarded as "persona non grata" to Kulp and she made it clear to people not to bring him up in conversation around her with the exception of interviews related to her time on Hillbillies. In his later years, especially after Kulp's death, Ebsen privately expressed remorse for doing the ad and they only reconciled shortly before Kulp's death.

After her defeat, she worked at Juniata College, a private liberal arts college in Huntingdon, Pennsylvania, as an artist-in-residence. Later she taught acting.

Personal life

Kulp married Charles Malcolm Dacus on April 1, 1951, in Dade County, Florida; they divorced in 1961. After her retirement from acting and teaching, she moved first to a farm in Connecticut and later to Palm Springs, California, where she became involved in several charity organizations, including the Humane Society of the Desert, the Desert Theatre League, and United Cerebral Palsy. In 1989, Kulp gave an interview to author and LGBT activist Boze Hadleigh in which she said,
As long as you reproduce my reply word for word, and the question, you may use it ... I'd appreciate it if you'd let me phrase the question. There is more than one way. Here's how I would ask it: "Do you think that opposites attract?" My own reply would be that I'm the other sort — I find that birds of a feather flock together. That answers your question.
Hadleigh states that Kulp was indicating that she was a lesbian. (Note that Boze Hadleigh is famous for publishing interviews of actors, after they've died, in which he states that they came out during the interview. Yet he refuses to share the audio tapes that would prove his claims.)

Death
Kulp, a cigarette smoker,was diagnosed with cancer in 1990 and received chemotherapy. By 1991 the cancer had spread, and she died on February 3, 1991, aged 69, in Palm Desert, California. Her remains are interred at Westminster Presbyterian Cemetery in Mifflintown, Pennsylvania.

Filmography

Film

Television

Theatre

Awards and nominations

Discography
Jerome Kern: Show Boat, conducted by John McGlinn, EMI, 1988

References

Sources

External links

 
 
 
 

1921 births
1991 deaths
20th-century American actresses
20th-century American LGBT people
Actors from Harrisburg, Pennsylvania
Actresses from Florida
Actresses from Pennsylvania
American actor-politicians
American film actresses
American television actresses
American voice actresses
American lesbian actresses
American Presbyterians
California Democrats
Deaths from cancer in California
Florida Democrats
Florida State University alumni
Military personnel from Florida
Pennsylvania Democrats
People from Miami-Dade County, Florida
People from Palm Desert, California
United States Navy officers
University of Miami alumni
WAVES personnel